Sabina Umeh  (born Sabina Ifeoma Umeh, 1969), is a Nigerian singer/songwriter and model.

Career 
The daughter of a renowned playwright and professor, Umeh was crowned Most Beautiful Girl in Nigeria (MBGN) 1990 in December 1989, and would participate in Miss Universe, Miss Intercontinental, and Miss World, where she won the Miss Personality award. Prior to MBGN, she had been crowned Miss Uniben.  Umeh vowed to avoid scandals, but found herself embroiled in one when journalists questioned her victory her boyfriend (now husband) Kesse Jabari, was revealed to be an employee of organisers Silverbird Productions. Umeh discredited the allegations, stating she had contested earlier in 1987 when Jabari was already with Silverbird, but lost to Omasan Buwa. Since ending her reign, Theatre Arts graduate Umeh has carved a career in music, television/film, modelling, and beauty, and has worked in public relations for cosmetic brand IKB. 

A specialist in dance, choreography and acting, Umeh is co-founder and artistic director of music production company Juicygroove which promotes aspiring talent in Nigeria and abroad, and has carved out a career in music. In 2013, she released a promotional CD which was a preview of her debut album "Warrior", with an international tour starting in Nigeria.

The Sabina brand is currently being managed and marketed in partnership with three of the top entertainment management teams in the United States.

References

External links
 Sabina Umeh-Akamune profile at juicygroove.com

1960s births
Igbo beauty pageant contestants
Living people
Miss Universe 1990 contestants
Miss World 1990 delegates
Most Beautiful Girl in Nigeria winners
Nigerian female models
Most Beautiful Girl in Nigeria contestants